Oneida County Airport  was a public airport in Whitestown in Oneida County, New York,  northwest of downtown Utica. The airport covered  and had two runways.

Oneida County closed the airport in January 2007 and transferred operations to Griffiss International Airport, (formerly Griffiss Air Force Base)

Federal Aviation Administration records say the airport boarded 2,122 passengers in calendar year 2004 and 1,951 in 2005.  The FAA's National Plan of Integrated Airport Systems for 2007–2011 classified it as a general aviation airport.

History 

In the 1960s, Mohawk Airlines stopped at Utica, and Empire Airlines in the 1980s; the first jets were Mohawk BAC 111s in 1965. Both airlines would become part of USAir, which had a presence at UCA until 1995 when USAir ended jet flights and closed its maintenance base and reservations center.

UCA had no airline service after Continental Connection carrier CommutAir left on June 30, 2002. In its final years, UCA flights had been under the EAS program; declining ridership led the required subsidy to breach the $200 per passenger statutory cap.

Service shifted to nearby Griffiss International Airport when Oneida closed.

The former airport site was purchased from Oneida County by New York State and is now the home of the New York State Preparedness Training Center (SPTC).

References

External links 
Griffo Names Panel to Outline Future For Oneida County Airport, 2005-04-07

Defunct airports in New York (state)
Transportation buildings and structures in Oneida County, New York
Former Essential Air Service airports